The Transport Act 2000 is an Act of the Parliament of the United Kingdom. It provided for a number of measures regarding transport in Great Britain; the first major change in the structure of the privatised railway system established under the Railways Act 1993.

Railways
The Director of Passenger Rail Franchising and the British Railways Board were both abolished and their functions transferred to the Strategic Rail Authority.

The Act provides the framework for the railway byelaws.

Aviation
The Act laid down the framework for the creation of a public-private partnership (effectively privatisation) of National Air Traffic Services.

Highways
Part III of the Act introduced the concept of the Road User Charge or Road User Charging schemes, and workplace parking levys. This enabled various road pricing schemes, such as the London congestion charge and extension of the Dartford Crossing tolls. The Act also enabled the creation of Home zones.

References

External links
Transport Act 2000 from the Office of Public Sector Information.

United Kingdom Acts of Parliament 2000
Railway Acts
2000 in transport
Transport policy in the United Kingdom
History of transport in the United Kingdom
Transport legislation